Galgenberg (Lütte) is a hill in Bad Belzig, Brandenburg, Germany.

Hills of Brandenburg